Alexander Buckner (March 8, 1785June 6, 1833) was a United States senator from Missouri.

Biography
Born in Jefferson County, Kentucky, he studied law and moved to Charlestown, Indiana in 1812. He moved to Missouri in 1818 and settled near Jackson; he practiced law and also engaged in agricultural pursuits. He was appointed by the Territorial Governor as circuit attorney for the Cape Girardeau district, and was president of the State constitutional convention in 1820. He was a member of the Missouri Senate from 1822 to 1826 and was elected to the U.S. Senate, serving from March 4, 1831, until his death due to cholera in Cape Girardeau County, 1833. Interment was on his farm in Cape Girardeau County; reinterment was in City Cemetery, Cape Girardeau, in 1897.

Buckner was instrumental in its founding of the Grand Lodge of Indiana and served as the first Grand Master of Masons in 1818.

See also
List of United States Congress members who died in office (1790–1899)

References

External links

1785 births
1833 deaths
Politicians from Louisville, Kentucky 
Missouri state senators
People from Cape Girardeau County, Missouri
United States senators from Missouri
Missouri Democratic-Republicans
Missouri Jacksonians
Deaths from cholera
Democratic-Republican Party United States senators
People from Charlestown, Indiana
19th-century American politicians